El Angel is a 2018 Argentine-Spanish true crime film directed by Luis Ortega. It was screened in the Un Certain Regard section at the 2018 Cannes Film Festival. It is inspired by the true story of Argentine serial killer Carlos Robledo Puch. It was selected as the Argentine entry for the Best Foreign Language Film at the 91st Academy Awards, but it was not nominated.

Plot

Carlos is a 17-year-old teenager with the face of an angel whom no one can resist. He gets everything he wants. In high school he meets Ramón and together they form a dangerously charming duo. They embark on a path of theft and lies, and quickly killing becomes a way of communicating.

Cast
 Lorenzo Ferro as Carlos Robledo Puch
 Chino Darín as Ramón Peralta
 Mercedes Morán as Ana María Peralta
 Daniel Fanego as José Peralta
 Luis Gnecco as Héctor Robledo Puch
 Peter Lanzani as Miguel Prieto
 Cecilia Roth as Aurora Robledo Puch
 Malena Villa as Marisol/Magdalena

Reception
Monica Castillo of RogerEbert.com wrote that director Luis Ortega took liberties with the true story by reimagining Carlos as a gay psychopathic killer, despite a lack of any proof this was true in reality. Castillo  complimented lead actor Lorenzo Ferro's performance as "eerily hollow and effectively scary" but said eventually "the character's eerie coldness leaves the movie feeling shallow." For The Canadian Press, David Friend said Ferro's performance evokes "the demonic cuteness of Macaulay Culkin in The Good Son."

Kerry Lengel of Arizona Republic said, "Ferro really has created a fascinating screen character. He is, in a word, sexy, and not just for his androgynous beauty but for that supposedly masculine glamour of the daredevil, the outlaw who refuses to play by society’s rules." On Rotten Tomatoes the film has a 73% approval rating from critics based on 56 reviews. The site's critics consensus reads: "As unsettling as it is entertaining, El ángel takes an absorbingly stylish look at the horrific exploits of a real-life serial killer."

See also
 List of submissions to the 91st Academy Awards for Best Foreign Language Film
 List of Argentine submissions for the Academy Award for Best Foreign Language Film

References

External links
 

2018 films
2018 crime films
2010s serial killer films
2010s biographical films
2010s Spanish-language films
2018 LGBT-related films
Spanish LGBT-related films
Argentine LGBT-related films
Argentine crime films
Argentine biographical films
20th Century Fox films
LGBT-related films based on actual events
El Deseo films
2010s Spanish films
2010s Argentine films